Khunga is a Village Development Committee in Baglung District in the Dhaulagiri Zone of central Nepal. At the time of the 1991 Nepal census it had a population of 2,926 and had 583 houses in the town.

References

Populated places in Baglung District